Shenango Creek is a stream in the U.S. state of West Virginia.

Shenango Creek most likely is a name derived from the Seneca language.

See also
List of rivers of West Virginia

References

Rivers of Wetzel County, West Virginia
Rivers of West Virginia